Benjamin James Chilwell (born 21 December 1996) is an English professional footballer who plays as a left-back for  club Chelsea and the England national team.

Beginning his career at Leicester City, Chilwell had a loan spell with Huddersfield Town and joined Chelsea in 2020.

Early life
Chilwell was born in Milton Keynes, Buckinghamshire, and was raised in Ampthill, Bedfordshire. He attended Redborne Upper School and Community College in Ampthill.

Club career

Leicester City
Chilwell joined Leicester City's academy aged 12 in 2009 having played in Rushden & Diamonds' centre of excellence. He won their Academy Player of the Year award at the end of the 2014–15 season.

After featuring for the club in pre-season under new manager Claudio Ranieri, Chilwell was given the number 30 shirt ahead of the 2015–16 season. He made his first-team debut on 27 October 2015 in the club's League Cup match against Hull City. Chilwell played the entire match as Leicester lost 5–4 on penalties following a 1–1 draw after extra time.

On 19 November 2015, Chilwell joined Championship club Huddersfield Town on a youth loan until 3 January 2016. He made his debut nine days later in a 2–0 home loss to Middlesbrough.

On 28 July 2016, Chilwell signed a new contract with Leicester until June 2021. He made his Premier League debut on 26 December in a 2–0 home defeat to Everton. Chilwell received praise for his performance. He made 19 appearances across the 2016–17 season, including two in the UEFA Champions League, and scored his first career goal on 18 May 2017 in a 6–1 home loss to Tottenham Hotspur.

Chilwell was sent off for the first time in his career on 13 January 2018 after receiving two yellow cards within five minutes of each other in a goalless draw away to Chelsea. He signed a new contract with Leicester on 20 October, tying him to the club until June 2024.

Chelsea
Chilwell signed for Leicester's Premier League rivals Chelsea on 26 August 2020 on a five-year contract for an undisclosed fee reported by BBC Sport to be £45 million. He made his debut on 23 September, providing the assist for Olivier Giroud's goal in a 6–0 home win against Barnsley in the third round of the EFL Cup after he came off from the bench. On his first league start for the club on 3 October, Chilwell scored the opening goal and assisted Kurt Zouma for the second as Chelsea beat Crystal Palace 4–0 at home. 

On 7 April 2021, Chilwell scored his first UEFA Champions League goal in a 2–0 away win over Porto in the first-leg of the quarter-final tie. On 16 May, Chilwell scored against his former club Leicester City in the 2021 FA Cup final in the 88th minute, only for it to be disallowed by VAR, as Leicester went on to win 1–0. On 29 May, Chilwell won his first-ever trophy after Chelsea defeated Manchester City 1–0 in the 2021 UEFA Champions League final in Porto.

On 2 October 2021, on his first Premier League start of the league campaign, Chilwell scored his first goal of the season in a 3–1 home win over Southampton. Chilwell would go on to score in Chelsea's next two league games as well, 1–0 win against Brentford and a 7–0 victory over Norwich City. Having scored in Chelsea's final match of the 2020–21 Premier League season, Chilwell became the first English player to score in four consecutive Premier League games for Chelsea since Frank Lampard in February 2013. 

On 23 November 2021, Chilwell sustained a ruptured cruciate ligament injury in a 4–0 home win during Chelsea's 2021–22 UEFA Champions League group stage match against Juventus. He was substituted in the second half after a coming together with Adrien Rabiot. On 28 December 2021, it was revealed in a statement by Chelsea that Chilwell would have to receive a surgical repair, which ruled him out for the rest of the season.

International career

Along with his Leicester teammate Demarai Gray, Chilwell was called up from the under-21 team to the full England squad in September 2018 for a friendly match against Switzerland. He made his debut in this match on 11 September, as a 79th-minute substitute for Danny Rose in a 1–0 home win. Upon taking to the pitch in the match at the King Power Stadium he became the first England player to debut at his club ground since Paul Scholes at Old Trafford in 1997. Chilwell made his first start on 12 October in a goalless draw with Croatia in the 2018–19 UEFA Nations League A, in a match played behind closed doors.

Chilwell was named in the 26-man England squad for UEFA Euro 2020. On 22 June 2021, Chilwell and fellow England player Mason Mount were forced to self-isolate after coming into contact with Scotland player Billy Gilmour, who tested positive for COVID-19 after England's goalless draw with Scotland at the tournament.

On 9 October 2021, Chilwell scored his first international goal in a 5–0 away win during England's 2022 FIFA World Cup qualification match against Andorra.

Personal life
Chilwell's father is from New Zealand and emigrated to England in 1993, three years prior to Chilwell's birth.

Chilwell's maternal grandfather Guy Shuttleworth was also a sportsman who played football for Corinthian-Casuals — winning an international cap for England Amateurs in 1949 — and represented Cambridge University at first-class cricket. He died at the age of 94 on 21 January 2021. Chilwell played cricket for his local club, Flitwick.

Chilwell is the godfather to England and former Leicester City teammate James Maddison's son.

Career statistics

Club

International

England score listed first, score column indicates score after each Chilwell goal

Honours
Chelsea
UEFA Champions League: 2020–21
UEFA Super Cup: 2021
FA Cup runner-up: 2020–21

England
UEFA Nations League third place: 2018–19
UEFA European Championship runner-up: 2020

Individual
UEFA Champions League Squad of the Season: 2020–21
Leicester City Under-21s Player of the Season: 2015–16
Leicester City Academy Player of the Year: 2014–15

References

External links

Profile at the Chelsea F.C. website
Profile at the Football Association website

1996 births
Living people
People from Milton Keynes
Footballers from Buckinghamshire
English footballers
Association football defenders
Rushden & Diamonds F.C. players
Leicester City F.C. players
Chelsea F.C. players
Huddersfield Town A.F.C. players
English Football League players
Premier League players
FA Cup Final players
UEFA Champions League winning players
England youth international footballers
England under-21 international footballers
England international footballers
UEFA Euro 2020 players
English people of New Zealand descent